Park Lane International School is an independent international day school located in Prague, the Czech Republic. The Park Lane student community consists of 600+ students, representing more than 40 nationalities. The home to foreign student ratio is 54% to 46%.

The EYFS, Primary and Secondary campuses currently cater for children from Pre-Nursery (aged 2–3) to Year 13 (aged 16–18). Following its IB World School accreditation in February 2018, Park Lane has recently expanded to accommodate pupils (aged 16–18), who study the International Baccalaureate Diploma Programme at the senior school branch at the Klárov site of Prague 1 campus.

Although classified as a British international school, because of its location in the Czech Republic, Park Lane also offers an intensive Czech programme for all pupils. This programme ensures that Park Lane's students pass their annual Czech state examinations as required by Czech law.

History 

Park Lane International School opened in 2006. Within 7 years, it had grown into a full-scale Primary school with 180 pupils on roll. In 2013, the Secondary school campus at Valdštejnská was opened. The Senior school site, located at Klárov, opened in the 2017/2018 academic year. The school caters for 600+ students from the EYFS through to Secondary school.

Locations 
Park Lane International School opened its first campus at Prague 5 Bertramka accommodating children aged from 2 to 6 years. The Prague 5 Bertramka campus accommodates the Early Years Foundation Stage.

The School's primary campus has its headquarters in a building called Norbertov at Prague 6. Norbertov, which originally served as a kindergarten and was built by the church in 1904. The school is located in Střešovice.

Another part of the Střešovice-Prague 6 campus is the Sibeliova branch, a villa with a purpose-designed garden that is home to the Early Years Foundation Stage. The Prague 6 Střešovice campus accommodates children from Nursery to Year 5.

The Secondary school, which opened in September 2013, is situated in the district of Malá Strana in a building situated directly alongside the walls of Prague Castle and close to Malostranská metro station and a major tram stop which serves several different routes. Surrounded by its own walled gardens and terraces in a plot measuring 3000m2, the building was used as an embassy for several decades.

The latest addition to the Prague 1 campus, located a short walk away from the Prague 1 Valdštejnská building, is the Klárov branch, which caters to students in the final four years of Secondary school and is a registered location for Cambridge IGCSE and IB Diploma examinations.

Curriculum 

The school follows the National Curriculum of England and offers British education to children from pre-nursery to university entrance, taught by the UK qualified native speakers, plus British trained foreign teachers and local teachers. 

Pupils at Park Lane International School prepare for KS2 National Tests and, at the secondary level, will sit for Cambridge IGCSE examinations, followed by the International Baccalaureate Diploma Programme (IBDP).

Modern Foreign languages at Park Lane are offered both within the curriculum provision as well as through the extracurricular activities. Students at Park Lane can choose among Spanish, French, German, and Russian languages.

Art and Music education are part of Park Lane's educational provision. The music department, in cooperation with the International School of Music and Fine Arts, offers a range of curriculum-based as well as extracurricular classes, both individual as well as groups, such as bands and choir. Every year, the music department holds an annual music extravaganza called the Sound of Park Lane.  Since 2015, the Art department has hosted the Park Lane International Film Festival (PLIFF) targeted at students of other international schools in the Czech Republic and beyond.

Scholarship 
Park Lane International School offers an IB scholarship programme to all potential candidates.

Accreditations and inspections 

Park Lane International School is an executive member of the Council of British International Schools, and undergoes regular inspections by the Independent Schools Inspectorate. Park Lane underwent its most recent British Schools Overseas (BSO) inspection in May 2022, achieving excellent results in all aspects of the inspection. It is  a member of the Independent Schools Council  and is recognized by the UK Department of Education.

Leadership 

From its inception until June 2012, the Director of Park Lane was Barbara (Basia) Lubaczewska. In September 2012, Paul Ingarfield took over as Principal of Park Lane. The Head of EYFS and Primary School is Mr Joe Eyles. Starting the school year 2021/22 Mr Paul Churchill has been appointed to run the Secondary school as Head of Secondary.

The school is administered by a governing board consisting of two proprietors, the Principal, the Head of Primary and EYFS, the Head of Secondary, and the Operations Executive. The governing board holds regular meetings 4-5 times per academic year and is supported by five specific committees composed of staff and parent-governors.

References

External links 

 Park Lane International School website

International schools in the Czech Republic
Schools in Prague
British international schools in Europe
2006 establishments in the Czech Republic
Educational institutions established in 2006